Anna Tovar is an American politician who currently serves as a member of Arizona Corporation Commission. She previously served as Mayor of Tolleson, Arizona, as State Senator representing the 19th district, and as a State Representative. She is a member of the Democratic Party.

Personal life and education
Tovar was raised in Tolleson, Arizona, where she met her husband, Juan Carlos Tovar. Tovar earned a bachelor's degree in Elementary Education from Arizona State University. Before going into politics, Tovar taught kindergarten and first grade. She and her husband have two children.

In 2002, Tovar was diagnosed with a rare form of leukemia, which required her to undergo chemotherapy and two bone-marrow transplants from her brother.

Political career
Before being elected to the Arizona legislature, Tovar served on the Tolleson City Council and was also Tolleson's Vice Mayor.

Tovar was elected to the Arizona House of Representatives in 2010. Tovar was elected to the Arizona Senate in 2012; she served on the Appropriations Committee and the Judiciary Committee. She was the Senate Democratic Minority Leader.

Tovar supports raising education spending, reforming the tax code, stopping the expansion of private prisons, and instituting stronger restrictions on gifts to legislators.

Tovar has been affiliated with JAG – Jobs for Arizona Graduates, WiLL/WAND – Women's Actions for New Directions, the National Association of Latino Elected and Appointed Officials, and the National Hispanic Caucus for State Legislators.

References

External links
 Official page at the Arizona State Legislature
 Campaign Website
 
 Biography at Ballotpedia
 Financial information (state office) at the National Institute for Money in State Politics

Arizona city council members
Democratic Party Arizona state senators
Arizona State University alumni
Living people
Democratic Party members of the Arizona House of Representatives
People from Maricopa County, Arizona
Place of birth missing (living people)
Women city councillors in Arizona
Women state legislators in Arizona
Year of birth missing (living people)
21st-century American women